Corinna Halke-Teichmann (born 9 July 1957 in Dortmund) is a German former pair skater and current sport journalist.

With partner  Eberhard Rausch, she is the 1974–1976 German national champion. They competed five times at the European Figure Skating Championships and the World Figure Skating Championships. They placed 10th at the 1972 Winter Olympics and 8th at the 1976 Winter Olympics.

After retirement from competitive skating in 1981, she became sport journalist. She has worked for the Bayerischen Rundfunk and for the German TV-station ARD since 1984.

She is married. The couple has one child.

Competitive highlights 
(with Eberhard Rausch)

References
 ARD profile
 ISU statistics

1957 births
Sportspeople from Dortmund
German female pair skaters
Olympic figure skaters of West Germany
Figure skaters at the 1972 Winter Olympics
Figure skaters at the 1976 Winter Olympics
Living people
20th-century German women
21st-century German women